Max Porter (born 29 June 1987) is an English former professional footballer who is currently employed as a youth team coach at Arsenal.

A midfielder, Porter represented nine clubs in the English football pyramid, notably being part of the Newport County side which won promotion from the Football Conference to the Football League in 2013.

Career
In his youth, Porter was part of the Tottenham Hotspur and Southend United set-ups before signing a professional contract with Cambridge United in 2005.
however, he stayed for only eight games before moving to Bishop's Stortford, where he saw more game time, and his good form for the Blues attracted the attention of Barnet boss Paul Fairclough, who signed Porter in May 2007. He spent two seasons with Barnet, but in April 2009 he was told he would be released at the end of the season. In May 2009, Porter signed a one-year contract with Conference National side Rushden & Diamonds, and played in almost every league game as the Diamonds reached the play-offs. Porter's good club form also earned him a call up to the England C team, for whom he played three games, scoring twice. Porter agreed a one-year extension to his Rushden contract at the beginning of June 2010.

In June 2011, following Rushden's dissolution, Porter signed for League Two club AFC Wimbledon. On 10 September, he scored his first goal for the club in an away game against Aldershot Town.

In February 2012 Porter signed for Newport County on loan. On 12 May 2012 he played for Newport in the FA Trophy Final at Wembley Stadium which Newport lost 2–0 to York City. In May 2012, Porter was released from AFC Wimbledon at the end of his contract. In June 2012 Porter signed a permanent contract with Newport County.

In the 2012–13 season he was part of the Newport team that finished third in the league, reaching the Conference National play-offs. Newport County won the play-off final 2–0 versus Wrexham at Wembley to return to the Football League after a 25-year absence with promotion to League Two.

He was released by Newport in May 2015 at the end of his contract, and on 27 May 2015 he joined Conference Premier club Bromley.

On 3 October 2016, it was announced that Porter's contract with Bromley had been terminated by mutual consent.

The day after he left Bromley, Porter joined National League South side Chelmsford City. On 16 May 2018, following a short loan move to Maldon & Tiptree, Porter extended his stay at Chelmsford, taking up a player-coach role in the process.

Retirement and coaching career
On 17 August 2019, Chelmsford announced the retirement of Porter, who took up a full time coaching role at Arsenal's under-13 team in the process. Since then Porter has been U14 Head Coach and Lead Phase before being promoted  to Professional Development Phase U18 assistant coach & U17 Head Coach.

Career statistics

References

External links

1987 births
Living people
Footballers from Hornchurch
English footballers
Association football midfielders
England semi-pro international footballers
Cambridge United F.C. players
Bishop's Stortford F.C. players
Barnet F.C. players
Rushden & Diamonds F.C. players
AFC Wimbledon players
Newport County A.F.C. players
Bromley F.C. players
Chelmsford City F.C. players
Maldon & Tiptree F.C. players
Arsenal F.C. non-playing staff
English Football League players
National League (English football) players
Chelmsford City F.C. non-playing staff
Association football coaches